Mark Andrew Turner (born 15 May 1969) is a former English cricketer. Turner was a right-handed batsman who bowled right-arm fast-medium. Turner was born in Blackpool, Lancashire.

Turner made his List-A debut for Huntingdonshire against Bedfordshire in the 1st round of the 1999 NatWest Trophy. He played a further match for the county in the 2000 NatWest Trophy against a Hampshire Cricket Board side.  In his 2 one-day matches, he scored 5 runs and took a single wicket.

References

External links
Mark Turner at Cricinfo
Mark Turner at CricketArchive

1969 births
Sportspeople from Blackpool
English cricketers
Huntingdonshire cricketers
Living people